Hydrocarboniphaga is a genus of bacteria from the family of Sinobacteraceae.

References

Further reading 
 

Gammaproteobacteria
Bacteria genera